Evelina Rodigari (born 14 September 1978) is an Italian former short track speed skater. She competed in the women's 3000 metre relay event at the 2002 Winter Olympics.

References

External links
 

1978 births
Living people
Italian female short track speed skaters
Olympic short track speed skaters of Italy
Short track speed skaters at the 2002 Winter Olympics
Sportspeople from the Province of Sondrio